Neela Butt is a tourist resort in Bagh District, Azad Kashmir, Pakistan.

References

Bagh District
Tourist attractions in Azad Kashmir